The District Four School is an historic school at 1515 West Shore Road in Warwick, Rhode Island, United States.  The -story wood-frame building was designed by William R. Walker of Providence, and built in 1886.  It is the oldest surviving school building in the city.  It was used as a public school until c. 1940, and was either vacant or occupied by social service agencies in the following decades.  It has been converted to residential use.

The building was listed on the National Register of Historic Places in 1997.

See also
National Register of Historic Places listings in Kent County, Rhode Island

References

Buildings and structures in Warwick, Rhode Island
Educational institutions established in 1886
School buildings completed in 1886
School buildings on the National Register of Historic Places in Rhode Island
Schools in Kent County, Rhode Island
Public high schools in Rhode Island
National Register of Historic Places in Kent County, Rhode Island
1886 establishments in Rhode Island